Ajyýap ( Adzhiyab) is a village in far south-western Turkmenistan about 15 km from the border with Iran. It is located in Esenguly District, Balkan Province. It has productive oil fields.

References

Populated places in Balkan Region